Onimusha: Warlords, known in Japan as , is a hack-and-slash action-adventure video game and the first entry of the Onimusha series, released for the PlayStation 2 in 2001. The original Warlords version was ported to Microsoft Windows, although it was only available in China and Russia. A remaster for Nintendo Switch, PlayStation 4, and Xbox One was released in 2018. A Windows version followed in 2019.

The game's plot is set in the Sengoku period and focuses on the samurai Samanosuke Akechi who fights against the forces of Nobunaga Oda. After Nobunaga's death in battle, Samanosuke goes on a quest to save Princess Yuki from demons working alongside Nobunaga's forces. The player controls Samanosuke and his partner, a female ninja Kaede, in their fight against demons.

While the game borrows elements from Capcom's own Resident Evil survival horror series, such as solving puzzles and a fixed camera, the game is focused more on the action game genre with Samanosuke possessing multiple weapons that can be upgraded by defeating several enemies. Capcom originally wanted to release the game for the original PlayStation but the close release of its next generation version resulted in the project being scrapped.

Following its release, Onimusha: Warlords achieved high popularity becoming the first PlayStation 2 game to reach one million sales. Its sales eventually surpassed two million units worldwide. The game has been well-received by video game publications and has been recognized as one of the best titles on the system. It was followed by two direct sequels for the same console and another three games within the franchise.

Gameplay
Onimusha: Warlords features pre-rendered backgrounds. The player primarily controls swordsman Samanosuke Akechi in his fight against demons. The game balances its action elements with puzzles that involve interacting with the environments and obtaining items to make progress.

The player begins the game with a standard katana sword, and can obtain long-range weapons with limited supply. As the player progresses, the protagonist Samanosuke can gain three elemental weapons: Raizan, Enryuu and Shippuu, each with an elemental magic attack. As enemies are defeated, they release different colored souls that are absorbed by using the demon gauntlet on Samanosuke's wrist: red souls act as "currency" which can be used to upgrade weaponry, yellow souls recover health, while blue souls recover magic power which is used to perform each weapon's elemental abilities.

Some sections are played with Samanosuke's assistant, the kunoichi Kaede. She has her own distinctive weapons and acrobatic abilities, but is unable to absorb souls.

Plot 
During the Battle of Okehazama, Samanosuke of the Akechi clan watches but is attacked by Imagawa Yoshimoto's men. Though Nobunaga Oda was victorious against Yoshimoto, he is fatally wounded and assumed dead. A year later, Samanosuke receives a letter from his cousin Princess Yuki of the Saitō clan for his assistance as she fears monsters are behind the disappearances of her servants. Joined by Kaede, Samanosuke arrives too late to Inabayama Castle as Yuki is abducted as he and Kaede split up to cover ground. After being defeated by a monster while trying to rescue Yuki, Samanosuke is visited by the twelve oni who give Samanosuke the power to vanquish the monsters that abducted Yuki, the Genma, and seal their souls in a mystical gauntlet. While searching for Yuki, Samanosuke finds a laboratory and encounters the Genma scientist Guildenstern, learning that the Genma have resurrected Nobunaga to serve them before slaying Guildenstern's creation Reynaldo. Samanosuke later encounters Nobunaga's servant Tokichiro as he attempted to recruit him before reunited with Kaede as they follow the boy Yumemaru who Yuki took under her care. When Samanosuke finds Yumemaru spirited off, he learns from Tokichiro that Yuki is essential for a human sacrifice where the Genmas' god Fortinbras will bless her blood that Nobunaga will drink to gain the power to destroy the Saitō clan.

After saving Yumemaru from the Genma Marcellus, Samanosuke leaves him with Kaede as he looks for Yuki underground. But as Tokichiro traps Samanosuke, Kaede is knocked out by Genma resembling Samanosuke while Yumemaru is taken by a woman. When she awakens, Kaede is led to the prison and finds Yuki locked in a cell. Guildenstern arrives and leaves Kaede to die at the hand of a powerful Genma, only for her kill it while escaping. Samanosuke awakens and kills his doppelgänger in the underground passage. He makes his way back into the keep and finds Yumemaru with the woman who introduces herself as the Genma Hecuba as she assumes her true form while spiriting Yumemaru into the netherworld with Samanosuke in pursuit. Joined by Kaede as he learns that her kin intends to kill Yumemaru before Yuki to heighten her sorrow to make her blood more potent for Nobunaga, Samanosuke kills Hecuba. As Samanosuke makes his way through the demon door, he encounters Guildenstern who summons an improved Marcellus. After defeating him, Samanosuke makes his way into Fortinbras' throne room, where he finds Yuki and Yumemaru trapped on the upper level. Before he can free them, Fortinbras enters the room and summons Nobunaga before the monster attacks Samanosuke. After Samanosuke defeats Fortinbras, he frees Yumemaru and Yuki as Kaede enters the room.

However, as they flee the collapsing chamber, Samanosuke is grabbed by Fortinbras as Kaede, Yumemaru, and Yuki are forced to escape. Some of Samanosuke's blood falls on the gauntlet and activates it as it transforms him into an Onimusha. In his Onimusha state, Samanosuke kills Fortinbras by stabbing him through his central eye. As Samanosuke transforms back into a human, he encounters Nobunaga and the two have a stare off as the room continues to collapse. It is not known what happens between Samanosuke and Nobunaga. During the ending sequence, Yuki and Yumemaru follow Samanosuke's advice and travel the world while Kaede dies 14 years later in a battle (In the original ending Kaede is said to have continued to search for Samanosuke but is unabled to find him, but this was corrected in Onimusha Blade Warriors that she does in fact find Samanosuke and they work together to take down the Genma). After the end credits, Samanosuke is seen alive, viewing Inabayama Castle from afar before he departs to parts unknown.

Development
The game originated in Yoshiki Okamoto's 1997 idea to create Sengoku Biohazard, a ninja version of Capcom's 1996 Resident Evil (known as Biohazard in Japan), set in the Sengoku period and featuring a "ninja house" filled with booby traps, similar to the mansion from Resident Evil, where battles would be fought using swords and shuriken: "The house will contain hidden doors behind walls, ceilings that fall down to you, scrolls and ninja magic, and many other ninja techniques". The project was originally intended for the Nintendo 64DD.

Onimusha was planned by Capcom as a trilogy. Its first title was originally being developed for the PlayStation, but the project was eventually moved to the PlayStation 2. The PlayStation version was scrapped and never released. It was about 50% complete before it was canceled. Onimusha team's excitement about the PlayStation 2's capabilities resulted in that change. They developed the game basing on the system from the Resident Evil series.

The game's plot was written by Noboru Sugimura and Flagship. The storyline was set in the Sengoku period due to how its multiple conflicts could provide an interesting background for the plot. While the historical Oda Nobunaga can be considered either a hero or a villain, Capcom chose to portray him as the latter one. Character movements were created using motion capture. Film actor and singer Takeshi Kaneshiro was the character model and Japanese voice actor for Samanosuke Akechi.

The game's orchestral music is credited in-game to composer Mamoru Samuragochi. According to Time: "To record it, Samuragoch[i] browbeat the producers into employing a 200-piece orchestra, including musicians playing such traditional instruments as a Japanese flute and taiko drums. The result is both haunting and inspirational, reminiscent of majestic scores for films like Lawrence of Arabia". However, he admitted in 2014 that he directed his orchestrator Takashi Niigaki to ghostwrite the music for the game, for which Samuragochi took full credit for composition.

In the English localization of Onimusha: Warlords, the word oni was translated as ogre and the word genma as "demon". In all subsequent games in the series the words oni and genma have remained intact in the English scripts. It was the only game within the series that gives players the option of hearing the voice acting in either English or Japanese with subtitles (this option was not provided in the UK/EU PAL version) until the fourth installment, which also had this feature.

Genma Onimusha
Onimusha: Warlords was ported to the Xbox in 2002 under the title Genma Onimusha, formally announced by Capcom in May 2001 with the company expecting to be released by late 2001. The overall game remains very similar with no changes to story. The Xbox version contains many updates to the game, including better graphics, new gameplay additions, and a new 5.1 Dolby Digital audio. There are no new weapons added, but the player can now find three different armors to wear, a ninja shinobi outfit, a grey colored samurai armor, and a fully masked samurai armor. When equipped, the in-game character model also changes. In contrary to this, the original armors that was found in the Playstation 2 released have been removed. The main new explorable area is a new tower area, which when finished will give Samanosuke the best armor in the game. Outside of new armor sets, the difficulty has also been increased with new enemy placements, as well as having enemies become superpowered if they are able to absorb the new green soul before the player can. The main new enemy is a killer doll who appears in certain scripted areas, following the character and dealing major damage. The doll is invincible and Samanosuke cannot defeat the doll in the game.

Additionally, the second major difference in Genma Onimusha is the inclusion of green souls. When five green souls are in the player's possession, the player can activate temporary invulnerability with a slow health recharge. Players frequently have to enter tug-of-war scenarios with the enemies over the possession of green souls; if a green soul is absorbed by a demon, the demon will gain new attacks and they will also see a dramatic increase in their defense. They will release a greater number of souls upon death. Lastly Samanosuke can now charge his magic attacks, dealing more damaged with longer charges.

Remaster
A remaster for Nintendo Switch, PlayStation 4, Xbox One was released on December 20, 2018 in Japan and on January 15, 2019 in other territories. Windows version via Steam was released worldwide in January 2019. This is a remaster of the original game, and doesn't include any features from Genma Onimusha. The game is now presented in HD, with clearer graphics and smoother framerate. New features include the ability to play in widescreen, with the screen scrolling up or down depending on the player's location. The soundtrack has been re-recorded due to controversy with the original composer Mamoru Samuragochi. The original model for Samanosuke, Takashi Kaneshiro, returned to redub his lines. Lastly you can now switch weapons in-game and no longer need to go to the items menu, although you cannot change weapons mid-combo. The remastered has sold over 300,000 unites across all platforms.

Reception

Onimusha: Warlords was a commercial success, selling over 2 million copies worldwide, with 1.04 million copies sold in Japan. The game went Platinum in just under a month in the region, quickly becoming the top-selling PlayStation 2 game ever at the time of its release. By July 2006, the PlayStation 2 version of Onimusha: Warlords had sold 800,000 copies and earned $28 million in the United States. Next Generation ranked it as the 75th highest-selling game launched for the PlayStation 2, Xbox or GameCube between January 2000 and July 2006 in that country. Combined sales of the Onimusha series reached 3 million units in the United States by July 2006. Capcom VP of Strategic Planning and Business Development Christian Svensson referred to the first two Onimusha games as one of their most successful titles.

The game has received positive reviews. Critics praised the graphics, sound, and gameplay, but complained about the short length of the game. In Japan, Famitsu magazine scored the PlayStation 2 version of the game a 35 out of 40, and gave the Xbox version a 34 out of 40. As of 2010, the game has a GameRankings average score of 84% for the PlayStation 2 version, and 81% for the Xbox port. The Xbox version was nominated for GameSpots annual "Best Story on Xbox" and "Best Action Adventure Game on Xbox" awards.

Blake Fischer reviewed the PlayStation 2 version of the game for Next Generation, rating it three stars out of five, and stated that "Onimusha is a beautiful game that lacks the refinement of more modern game designs. It's a pretty good ride, but one that you'll forget as new PS2 games appear".

At the SIGGRAPH 2000 conference, Onimusha received the "Best of Show" award for its opening sequence. Complex listed it as one of the most beloved and missed PlayStation 2 games. The reviewer from GameSpot said that he was called biased multiple times when doing the article for the video game. In a 2010 retrospective, GamePro ranked it as the 28th best game for the PlayStation 2. In 2012, FHM included the game's Kaede among the nine "sexiest ninja babes in games".

The 2019 remaster received mixed-to-positive reviews from critics; while its action gameplay was praised for standing the test of time, its visuals, game design, and presentation were said to have aged poorly. The remaster's lack of the additional content found in Genma Onimusha was also met with criticism. Horror media website Bloody Disgusting gave it a 3.5/5, writing that "beneath a new lick of paint and some clever adjustments, Onimusha: Warlords doesn't make for an essential action game in 2019, but it's a great modernization all the same", while Windows Central gave the Xbox One version a 4 out of 5, calling it "not perfect by any means", but going on to state that it was a "wonderful blast from the past". In a more critical review, IGN awarded the game with a 6.5/10, the final verdict being that "Onimusha: Warlords is exactly how you remember it, and in 2019, that's not necessarily a good thing".

Legacy

The game spawned two direct sequels, Onimusha 2: Samurai's Destiny and Onimusha 3: Demon Siege, that followed Samanosuke and more warriors in their fight against Nobunaga Oda. While Demon Siege was the closing chapter of the story, Capcom developed Onimusha: Dawn of Dreams due to popular fan response. There have been two spin-offs, Onimusha Tactics and Onimusha Blade Warriors, that focus on different genres. A bug within Warlords inspired game designer Hideki Kamiya in the making of the action game Devil May Cry.

Notes

References

External links
 

2001 video games
3D beat 'em ups
Action-adventure games
Cancelled 64DD games
Cancelled PlayStation (console) games
Capcom beat 'em ups
Dark fantasy video games
Hack and slash games
Video games about ninja
Nintendo Switch games
Onimusha
PlayStation 2 games
PlayStation 4 games
Video games about samurai
Sengoku video games
Single-player video games
Video games about demons
Video games developed in Japan
Video games featuring female protagonists
Video games set in castles
Video games set in feudal Japan
Video games set in Japan
Video games set in the 16th century
Windows games
Xbox games
Xbox One games